Rejoice! I'm Dead! is the fourteenth studio album by Gong and the eleventh album by the Daevid Allen version of the group.

Overview
Rejoice! I'm Dead! is the first Gong album to be released since the deaths of co-founders Daevid Allen and Gilli Smyth. Dave Sturt stated about the album: 'Inspired by the light, love and passing of our dear friend and inspiration, Daevid Allen.'

Recording 
Recorded at Brixton Hill Studios "and beyond", Spring 2016.  
'Model Village' includes a sample of 'Floating Anarchy Manifesto' recorded at the Bananamoon Observatory Studios, Australia
'Glastonbury Town' was made at the Music Room rehearsal studios in London on the 22nd of April, 2013.
'The Paragraph Time Chose To Forget' recorded at The Lighthouse, Dealn on the 27th of January, 2016.

DVD : 5.1 Surround Sound mixed at Soord Studios. 5.1 Surround mastered at Super Sound Mastering

Release 
The album was released on  through Madfish on CD (in digipak) and vinyl LP. A double CD / DVD-Audio version in a deluxe 12″ 44 page hardback book is also available featuring the album, a bonus CD of extras and a DVD-Audio disc with 24/96 PCM stereo and DTS 96/24 5.1 digital surround mixes.

Track listing

Disc one. Rejoice! I'm Dead!

Disc two. Floating Anarchy Manifesto

DVDA/V - MLP & DTS 5.1 and LPCM stereo

Personnel

Gong
Kavus Torabi (Cardiacs, Knifeworld) – vocals, guitar
Fabio Golfetti – guitar, vocals
Dave Sturt (Jade Warrior) – bass, vocals
Ian East – sax, flute
Cheb Nettles – drums, vocals
Daevid Allen – vocals (tracks 4, 5, 10)
Former Gong
Steve Hillage – guitar solo (track 2)
Didier Malherbe – duduk (tracks 4, 8)
Graham Clark: violin (track 1, 11)

Production credits
Produced by Gong
That Girl – Cover, Illustration
Gong, Nick Howiantz – engineer
57design.co.uk – Layout, Illustration [Gong Mandala]
Andy Jackson, Neil Wilkes (tracks: DVD) – mastering
Dave Sturt, Mark Cawthra – mixed

References

2016 albums
Gong (band) albums